Magnesium polonide (MgPo) is a salt of magnesium and polonium. It is a polonide, a set of very chemically stable compounds of polonium.

Preparation
Magnesium polonide can be produced by heating a mixture of elemental magnesium and polonium at 300–400 °C.

Structure
Magnesium polonide has the nickeline (NiAs) structure. It is unusual among polonides in not being isomorphous with the corresponding sulfide, selenide and telluride; only mercury polonide (HgPo) shares this property.

References

Magnesium compounds
Polonides
Nickel arsenide structure type